Quakertown (also known as Prettymanville) is an unincorporated community in Sussex County, Delaware, United States. Quakertown is located on U.S. Route 9 Business, southwest of Lewes.

References

External links

Unincorporated communities in Sussex County, Delaware
Unincorporated communities in Delaware